John Andrew Shelburne (September 26, 1894 – January 29, 1978) was an American football player and coach. He played college football at Dartmouth College, earning three letters from 1911 to 1913. Shelburne played professionally with the Hammond Pros of the National Football League (NFL) in 1922. He was one of only 13 African-Americans to play in the league prior to World War II. Shelburne served as the head football coach at Lincoln University in Pennsylvania in 1921, compiling a record of 8–1.

Shelburne was born in the West End of Boston. He graduated with honors from The English High School in 1914 and then attended Colby Academy in New London, New Hampshire before moving on to Dartmouth. Shelburne later worked at the Shaw House for 30 years as a social worker and was the director of the Breezy Meadows Camp in Holliston, Massachusetts. He died on January 29, 1978.

Head coaching record

References

External links
 

1894 births
1978 deaths
American football fullbacks
American social workers
Dartmouth Big Green football players
Hammond Pros players
Lincoln Lions athletic directors
Lincoln Lions football coaches
Colby–Sawyer College alumni
English High School of Boston alumni
Sportspeople from Boston
Coaches of American football from Massachusetts
Players of American football from Boston
African-American coaches of American football
African-American players of American football
African-American college athletic directors in the United States
20th-century African-American sportspeople